Halvorsen is a Norwegian patronymic surname which may refer to:

 Aasmund Halvorsen Vinje (1851–1917), Norwegian politician for the Liberal Party 
 Asbjørn Halvorsen (1898–1955), Norwegian footballer. 
 Birger Halvorsen (1905–1976), Norwegian high jumper
 Einfrid Halvorsen, Norwegian politician for the Labour Party
 Gail Halvorsen (1920–2022), American command pilot
 Gunnar Halvorsen (1945–2006), Norwegian politician for the Labour Party 
 Harald Halvorsen (gymnast), Norwegian gymnast
 Harald Halvorsen (politician), Norwegian politician for the Labour Party
 Håvard Halvorsen, Norwegian football defender
 Hjalmer S. Halvorsen (1884–1970), American politician
 Jan Halvor Halvorsen, Norwegian football manager
 Johan Halvorsen (1864–1935), Norwegian composer, conductor and violinist
 Johan Magnus Halvorsen, Norwegian politician for the Liberal Party
 John Halvorsen, Norwegian long-distance runner 
 Katherine Halvorsen, American statistician
 Kathy Halvorsen, American environmental scientist
 Krister Halvorsen, British American Football Referee
 Kristin Halvorsen, Norwegian socialist politician
 Lars Halvorsen Sons, boat builders
 Mette Halvorsen, Norwegian curler
 Otto Bahr Halvorsen (1872–1923), Norwegian politician from the Conservative Party
 Stian Lind Halvorsen, Norwegian football defender
 Tor Halvorsen (1930–1987), Norwegian trade unionist and politician for the Labour Party
 Tore Halvorsen, Norwegian entrepreneur and CEO of FMC Technologies
 Trond Halvorsen Wirstad (1904–1985), Norwegian politician for the Centre Party
 Trygve Halvorsen, Norwegian chess player
 Sigurd Halvorsen Johannessen (1881–1964), Norwegian acting councillor of state

See also
 Halvor
Halvorson

Norwegian-language surnames
Patronymic surnames